Miazga is a Polish surname. It was first recorded in 1399 and is derived from the Polish noun miazga meaning "pulp", "mash". Notable people with the name Miazga include:

Corinna Miazga (1983–2023), German politician
Matt Miazga (born 1995), American soccer player
Renata Knapik-Miazga (born 1988), Polish épée fencer
Matthew Miazga (born 20th century), Canadian Crown prosecutor; known for the case Miazga v Kvello Estate

See also

References

Polish-language surnames
Surnames of Polish origin